Kiss Me Deadly is a 1955 American film noir.

Kiss Me Deadly may also refer to:

Music
 "Kiss Me Deadly", a song by Generation X from the 1978 album Generation X
 Kiss Me Deadly (album), a 1981 album by Generation X
 "Kiss Me Deadly" (song), a 1988 song by Lita Ford
 Kiss Me Deadly, a moniker used by Lita Ford and her band in 2008
 Kiss Me Deadly, a Canadian band featuring Sophie Trudeau
 "Kiss Me Deadly", a song by The Brian Setzer Orchestra from the 2009 album Songs from Lonely Avenue

Other
 Kiss Me, Deadly, a novel by Mickey Spillane
 Kiss Me Deadly (company), British lingerie company
 Kiss Me Deadly (2008 film), an action thriller film starring Robert Gant and Shannen Doherty
 "Kiss Me Deadly", an episode of the TV series Instant Star